Bedmond is a village in the Three Rivers district of the English ceremonial county of Hertfordshire. Bedmond belongs to the civil parish of Abbots Langley and at the time of the 2011 Census, its population was included in Abbots Langley's population figures.

Bedmond is the birthplace of Nicholas Breakspear, later Pope Adrian IV, the only Englishman to ever be Pope, who is believed to have been born at Breakspear Farm . The site where his home stood is marked by a plaque.

The Anglican Church of The Ascension in Bedmond is a rare example of a surviving "tin tabernacle", a pre-fabricated church building made from corrugated galvanised iron and one of only a few remaining in use for worship in the country. It was built in 1880 for the cost of £80, which was donated by the wife of the squire.  It became a Grade II listed building in 1978.

References
Footnotes

Notes

External links
The Parish of Abbots Langley

Villages in Hertfordshire
Three Rivers District